The Asian parti-colored bat (Vespertilio sinensis) is a species of parti-coloured bat. Asian parti-colored bats are distributed across East Asia, from Taiwan through eastern China, eastern Mongolia and Russia (Siberia) to the Korean Peninsula and Japan (Hokkaido, Honshu, Shikoku, and Kyushu).

Taxonomy and etymology
It was described as a new species in 1880 by German naturalist Wilhelm Peters. Peters named it Vesperus sinensis. Its species name "sinensis" comes from Latin Sinae, meaning "China." The holotype was collected in Beijing. The species was known as V. superans until 1997 when it was demonstrated that V. sinensis should be used under the nomenclature rule known as the Principle of Priority.

Description
Its hairs are bicolored, with the basal portions blackish brown and the distal portions off-white.

Range and habitat
Its range includes several countries and regions in eastern Asia, such as China and Taiwan, Japan, North and South Korea, Mongolia, and Siberia.

Conservation
As of 2019, it is evaluated as a least-concern species by the IUCN.

References

Mammals of East Asia
Vespertilio
Mammals described in 1880
Taxa named by Wilhelm Peters
Bats of Asia